The People's Will Movement (Movimiento Voluntad Popular) is a political party in Colombia. 
At the last legislative elections, 10 March 2002, the party won as one of the many small parties parliamentary representation.

Political parties in Colombia